The 1927 All-Big Ten Conference football team consists of American football players selected to the All-Big Ten Conference teams chosen by various selectors for the 1927 Big Ten Conference football season.

All Big-Ten selections

Ends
 Bennie Oosterbaan, Michigan (AP-1, CDN-1, HJ-1; UP-1; WE-1)
 Waldo A. Fisher, Northwestern (AP-1, CDN-1, HJ-1; UP-1; WE-3)
 Ken Haycraft, Minnesota (AP-2, HJ-2; WE-1)
 Garland Grange, Illinois (AP-2, CDN-2; WE-2)
 Don Cameron, Wisconsin (HJ-2)
 LeRoy G. Heston, Michigan (CDN-2)
 Robert E. Tanner, Minnesota (WE-2)
 Herman Z. Nyland, Michigan (WE-3)

Tackles
 Leo Raskowski, Ohio State (AP-1, CDN-1, HJ-1; UP-1; WE-1)
 Butch Nowack, Illinois (AP-1, CDN-1, HJ-2; WE-1)
 Mike Gary, Minnesota (AP-2, HJ-1; UP-1; WE-3)
 Spike Nelson, Iowa (AP-2, CDN-2, HJ-2; WE-2)
 Lewis, Minnesota (CDN-2)
 Stanley Binish, Wisconsin (WE-2)
 Norman Gabel, Michigan (WE-3)

Guards
 Ray Baer, Michigan (AP-1, CDN-1, HJ-1; UP-1; WE-1)
 Harold W. Hanson, Minnesota (AP-1, HJ-2; WE-2)
 John R. Matthews, Indiana (AP-2; WE-1)
 George Gibson, Minnesota (AP-2)
 Ernest W. Schultz, Illinois (HJ-2)
 Justin Whitlock Dart, Northwestern (CDN-1)
 Wilbert O. Catterton, Indiana (CDN-2)
 Russell J. Crane, Illinois (CDN-2; WE-2)
 Weaver, Chicago (WE-3)
 Carroll Ringwalt, Indiana (WE-3)

Centers
 Ken Rouse, Chicago (AP-1, CDN-1, HJ-1 [guard]; UP-1; WE-1)
 Robert Reitsch, Illinois (AP-2, CDN-2, HJ-1; UP-1; WE-2)
 Clare Randolph, Indiana (HJ-2)
 George E. MacKinnon, Minnesota (WE-3)

Quarterbacks
 Harold "Shorty" Almquist, Minnesota (AP-1 [halfback], CDN-1, HJ-1; UP-1; WE-1)
 Edwin Crofoot, Wisconsin (AP-1, CDN-2, HJ-2; UP-2 [halfback])
 Byron Eby, Ohio State (AP-2)
 Vic Gustafson, Northwestern (UP-2)
 Harold Barnhart, Minnesota (WE-2)
 Carl Pignatelli, Iowa (UP-3)
 Fred Grim, Ohio State (WE-3)

Halfbacks
 Louis Gilbert, Michigan (AP-1, CDN-1, HJ-1; UP-1; WE-1)
 Jud Timm, Illinois (AP-2, CDN-1, HJ-1; UP-1; WE-1)
 Chester "Cotton" Wilcox, Purdue (AP-2; UP-2)
 Malvin Nydahl, Minnesota (HJ-2; WE-3)
 Ralph Welch, Purdue (CDN-2, HJ-2; WE-2)
 Mendenhall, Chicago (CDN-2)
 Paul Armil, Iowa (UP-3)
 Chuck Bennett, Indiana (UP-3; WE-2)
 Gene H. Rose, Wisconsin (WE-3)

Fullbacks
 Herb Joesting, Minnesota (AP-1, CDN-1, HJ-1; UP-1; WE-1)
 Tiny Lewis, Northwestern (AP-2, CDN-2, HJ-2; UP-2)
 George E. Rich, Michigan (WE-2)
 Fred Humbert, Illinois (UP-3)
 Abraham Koransky, Purdue (WE-3)

Key

AP = Associated Press

CDN = Chicago Daily News

HJ = Harold Johnson for the Chicago Evening American

UP = United Press, chosen by UP correspondent Clark B. Kelsey "in collaboration with a dozen football writers in Big Ten territory"

WE = Walter Eckersall

Bold = Consensus first-team selections of a majority of the AP, UP and Eckersall

See also
1927 College Football All-America Team

References

1927 Big Ten Conference football season
All-Big Ten Conference football teams